Emilia Schatz (born February 18, 1979) is an American video game designer best known for her work at Naughty Dog. She studied computer science at the University of North Texas, where she later worked for almost three years before searching for work in the video game industry. She was hired at Terminal Reality, where she worked as a level scripter on Re-Mission, as a level designer on BlowOut and BloodRayne 2, and as a senior game designer on Ghostbusters: The Video Game. She applied for jobs at other studios, and in 2009 was hired at Naughty Dog. She began working at Naughty Dog early in development on Uncharted 3: Drake's Deception, for which she designed several levels. She assisted with development of The Last of Us.

Assigned male at birth, Schatz came out as transgender in 2012, when she began her gender transition, and came out to the company in March 2014. She was promoted to co-lead game designer for the development of Uncharted 4: A Thief's End. In this role, she often worked alongside Bruce Straley and Neil Druckmann, and she helped to work on the game's accessibility options. She was co-lead game designer for the development of The Last of Us Part II, during which she continued to lead the company's accessibility efforts. Her work and image in the industry has been praised and awarded.

Early life 
Emilia Schatz was born on February 18, 1979. She grew up in Texas. Her mother is an art teacher at an elementary school; Schatz felt that, outside of games, teaching would also be her career choice. As a child, Schatz was a fan of Nintendo games, specifically Mario and The Legend of Zelda, and had a fondness for the Nintendo Entertainment System and the Super Nintendo Entertainment System. Schatz's early jobs included mowing lawns, data entry, installing ethernet, and working at Golden Corral. At high school, she learned how to program role-playing games on her calculator. To pay for her university studies, Schatz worked with professors to create web pages. She studied computer science at Baylor University from 1997 to 1999. In 2001, she graduated from the University of North Texas with a Bachelor of Computer Science, with a major in general studies and minors in computer science, art, and English. As part of the university's Laboratory for Recreational Computing, Schatz worked on several educational games in Adobe Flash. She also used Flash to develop her own games, including one inspired by Tempest (1981) on a bootleg development environment for Game Boy Advance.

Career

Terminal Reality (2002–2009) 
After graduating from the University of North Texas in 2001, Schatz continued to work there for almost three years as a web developer. She applied to multiple game development studios in Dallas, and in August 2002 was hired by Terminal Reality as a level scripter on Re-Mission, which aligned with her former experience with educational Flash games; she designed several levels for Re-Mission. She worked as a level designer on BlowOut (2003) and BloodRayne 2; she found the latter jarring due to the oversexualization of the lead character. She also worked as a senior game designer on the canceled game Demonik and Ghostbusters: The Video Game (2009), and provided additional game design work on Kinect Star Wars (2012). She described the experience of developing Ghostbusters: The Video Game as "really fun to work on", but was becoming restless and felt that she "wasn't making the games I always wished I could make".

Following the release of Ghostbusters: The Video Game, having spent seven years at Terminal Reality, Schatz began applying for positions at her "dream studios", including Double Fine and Naughty Dog; she noted that she "wasn't that interested" in Sony's games until she played Naughty Dog's Uncharted: Drake's Fortune (2007), and had enjoyed the cinematic qualities of Crash Bandicoot and Jak and Daxter, so felt that it would be a good studio to work with. She soon had a phone interview with Naughty Dog, and was later flown out for an in-person test and interview in November 2009. As part of the test, she had to design a level in 30 minutes; by the end of the day, she was hired.

Naughty Dog (2010–present) 

Schatz's first day at Naughty Dog was January 6, 2010. She began working at the company early in development on Uncharted 3: Drake's Deception (2011). She designed the French château level, the foot chase, and the ending's underground and collapse segments. She would often reference The Legend of Zelda when designing levels for the game. In April 2012, Schatz participated in a panel discussion at PAX East alongside game director Justin Richmond and community strategist Arne Meyer. After the release of Uncharted 3, Schatz assisted with the final months of development on The Last of Us (2013), providing additional design instead of creating from scratch; she designed the segment in which the player runs from an armored truck, as well as one of the final levels as the player escapes from the hospital, which she took over from designer Peter Field.

At the GaymerX convention in July 2014, Schatz participated in a panel discussion about queer identities in gaming. In December 2014, she participated in a panel about game design at PlayStation Experience. In April 2015, she spoke at a panel at WonderCon. For the development of Uncharted 4: A Thief's End (2016), Schatz was promoted to co-lead game designer. As part of this role, she oversaw the creation of levels and often checked in with artists and programmers working on them. She would also regularly meet with game director Bruce Straley and creative director Neil Druckmann about the game's story and overall direction. Schatz and user interface (UI) designer Alex Neonakis collaborated on the game's accessibility options, having received emails and messages from disabled gamers requesting them. Schatz noted that the push for accessibility was initially a struggle, but they had much more support by the end of development. Schatz designed the game's Scotland, Marooned, and No Escape levels, as well as some of the game's systems, including rock climbing and slope sliding.

Schatz spoke at the Wonder Woman Tech 2016 Conference in July 2016. In 2017, Schatz was named among the 100 Most Creative People by Fast Company "for helping the gaming industry evolve". In 2017, she began providing lectures in the level design course at CG Master Academy; she learned more about her own design work by breaking it down for the classes, and found the process rewarding to see the students' improvement. She wants to continue supplemental teaching work in the future to guide aspiring game developers. Schatz was co-lead game designer for the development of The Last of Us Part II (2020). In December 2016, she crocheted a yarn doll of Ellie, the game's protagonist, and provided instructions on Naughty Dog's website. The game's depiction of queer and transgender characters was personally important to Schatz, though she anticipated that it would receive criticism. Schatz was responsible for the addition of a rainbow crosswalk and transgender flag in the Capitol Hill level of the game, and worked with the writers to include a queer bookstore.

Schatz continued leading the studio's accessibility efforts for The Last of Us Part II, now alongside lead systems designer Matthew Gallant. They ensured that these options were prioritized early in development. Schatz felt that the accessibility options in Uncharted 4 were "pretty sparse" despite the praise they received, and wanted to improve upon them in The Last of Us Part II. Schatz and Gallant accepted the award for Innovation in Accessibility at the Game Awards 2020. She is also co-nominated for Outstanding Achievement in Game Design at the 24th Annual D.I.C.E. Awards. In June 2020, Arti Sergeev of 80 Level named Schatz as one of the six developers at Naughty Dog who "revolutionized the industry".

Personal life 
Assigned male at birth, Schatz began the process of gender transition in 2012, coming out to her family and friends. In late 2012, she began anonymously talking with human resources at Sony to discover more about the company's diversity guidelines. She came out to the head of operations at Naughty Dog and organized a plan to send a company-wide email, which they coordinated with co-presidents Christophe Balestra and Evan Wells. The company set up the transition so that, when Schatz returned the week after sending the email, she had a new email address, business cards, and company head shot; her name was changed in the credits of The Last of Us Remastered (2014). She sent the email on March 14, 2014. Nervous about the response, Schatz brought in cookies made by her wife and gave them to everyone. In deciding to come out, she described the process as "less of an 'if' and more of a 'when'", as she was beginning to suffer emotionally by pretending to identify as male at work.

Schatz and her wife Katy, a young adult fantasy novelist, live in Santa Monica with their daughter and cats. Their daughter was born on December 24, 2017. Some of Schatz's favorite games that have influenced her as developer include The Legend of Zelda: A Link to the Past (1991), Secret of Mana (1993), Final Fantasy VI (1994), and Super Metroid (1994). She has a particular interest in Metroidvania games due to the exploration and discovery of secrets. Schatz participated in the 2017 Women's March.

Works

Video games

References 

1979 births
American video game designers
Living people
Naughty Dog people
People from Texas
Transgender women
Uncharted
University of North Texas alumni
Women video game designers
Women video game developers